The 1991 Orlando Predators season was the 1st season for the franchise. They were formed as part of an expansion for 1991. They went 3–7 and  missed the playoffs.

Regular season

Schedule

Standings

y – clinched regular-season title

x – clinched playoff spot

Roster

Awards

External links
1991 Orlando Predators at ArenaFan.com

Orlando Predators
Orlando Predators seasons
Orlando Predators
1990s in Orlando, Florida